The 2009 Suruga Bank Championship was a match between the winners of the previous season's J. League Cup and the Copa Sudamericana. It was contested by the 2008 J. League Cup winner Japanese club Oita Trinita and the 2008 Copa Sudamericana champion Brazilian club Internacional.

Internacional won the match 2–1 to win their first Suruga Bank Championship, and their fifth international title.

Summary

External links
Official page on CONMEBOL's site
Suruga Bank Championship on Universofutbol's.com site
Full Report
All about 2009 Suruga Bank Championship

2009 in South American football
2009
2009 in Japanese football
Oita Trinita matches
Sport Club Internacional matches